The Philippine Independent Church (officially in ; ; ; colloquially called the Aglipayan Church, IFI, and PIC) is an independent Christian denomination, in the form of a nationalist church, in the Philippines. Its schism from the Roman Catholic Church was proclaimed during the American colonial period in 1902, following the end of the Philippine–American War, by members of the Unión Obrera Democrática Filipina due to the mistreatment of the Filipinos by Spanish priests, and influenced by the executions of José Rizal and Filipino priests and prominent secularization movement figures Mariano Gomez, José Burgos, and Jacinto Zamora, during earlier Spanish colonial rule. 

Prolific Filipino historian Teodoro Agoncillo described the Philippine Independent Church as "the only living and tangible result of the Philippine Revolution." Ever since its inception, the IFI/PIC Aglipayanism is widely referred as a schismatic, rather than a heretical movement. The Philippine Independent Church universally maintains and adheres to the core set of beliefs and practices of catholicity.

Its central office is located at the National Cathedral of the Holy Child in Ermita, Manila. The Philippine Independent Church is the country's first and oldest independent church. It is ecumenically in full communion with the worldwide Anglican Communion while still maintaining its independence as per their concordat.

History

Gregorio Aglipay and the Philippine Revolution

Gregorio Aglipay was an activist and Roman Catholic priest from Ilocos Norte, who would later be excommunicated by then Archbishop of Manila, Bernardino Nozaleda, for "usurpation of ecclesiastical jurisdiction" by joining Emilio Aguinaldo's libertarian movement and suspicion in possibly fomenting schism with the Pope (then Pope Leo XIII) in 1899 at the height of the Philippine–American War. 

During the Philippine Revolution, Aglipay and his former classmate Isabelo de los Reyes (also known as Don Belong), an ilustrado author, journalist, and labour activist, who was on exile in Spain at the time, acted to reform the Filipino Catholic clergy which was then dominated and ruled by Spanish friars. Native Filipino priests were prohibited to administer a parish back then and were just coadjutors or assistants to the Spanish friars. Then-President Emilio Aguinaldo persuaded Aglipay to head the native Filipino clergy by appointing him military vicar general in 1898, wishing to overthrow the spiritual power of the Spanish friar-bishops. 

Aglipay was a member of the Malolos Congress, the lone member coming from the religious sector, although he also represented his home province, as well.

Aglipay was also a guerilla leader during the Philippine–American War, with the rank of lieutenant-general. He was also the convener of the Filipino Ecclesiastical Council (Paniqui Assembly) on October 23, 1899, months following his excommunication, in response to the manifesto of former Prime Minister Apolinario Mabini, who first came up with the idea of urging the Filipino clergy to organize a Filipino national church, but not necessarily a schism, which received support from Aguinaldo. The assembly was attended by 28 native Filipino priests, thus, the short-lived national church was established. However, it was disestablished in 1901 following the dissolution of the First Philippine Republic.

Post-excommunication and establishment by Isabelo de los Reyes

Following the Philippine–American War, Isabelo de los Reyes, together with the members of Unión Obrera Democrática Filipina, founded and publicly proclaimed the commencement of the Iglesia Filipina Independiente (translated to "Philippine Independent Church" in English) on August 3, 1902, at the Centro de Bellas Artes in Quiapo, Manila. The church was incorporated with the then-Insular Government of the Philippines as a religious corporation sole in 1904. The new church rejected the spiritual authority and infallibility of the Pope and abolished the celibacy requirement for priests, allowing them to marry. At that time, all of its clergy were former Roman Catholic priests, mostly from the Ilocos Region, some of whom became the church's first consecrated bishops, as justified in accordance with the church's early Fundamental Epistles.

De los Reyes was the chief initiator of the separation and suggested that Aglipay should be the founding head, or Obispo Maximo (Supreme Bishop), of the church. De los Reyes' idea to form a new church was conceptualized upon his repatriation to the Philippines from Spain in 1901 after his talks with Giuseppe Francica-Nava de Bontifè, then the Apostolic Nuncio to Spain, in 1899 to request the Holy See in looking into the conditions of the Philippines had failed. By then, the country had changed from Spanish rule to American. Spanish friars were still in control of the parishes all throughout the country, and de los Reyes feared that American clergy would soon later replace the Spanish, instead of native Filipinos. Along with the American colonization was the arrival of the American Protestant missionaries in the Philippines starting in 1901. 

De los Reyes managed to rally enough people from his organization, Unión Obrera Democrática Filipina, the first modern labor union federation in the country, to create an independent church "conserving all that is good in the Roman Church and eliminating all the deceptions, which the Romanists had introduced, to corrupt the moral purity and sacredness of the doctrines of Christ." At the time, he had the necessary logistics needed to form a new church, but one: an equipped and empowered bishop to head it.

At first, the already-excommunicated Aglipay was reluctant, as he was initially against a schism and was faithful to the magisterium. He believed that all means of reaching an understanding with Rome should be exhausted first before declaring any schism. However, after his talks with Jesuit and Protestant leaders quickly backfired when both were dismissive and would not allow native Filipino priests lead their respective churches, he eventually accepted de los Reyes' offer to establish an independent church on September 6, 1902, and became one of its bishops while also serving as the de facto supreme bishop, until he was finally consecrated to the position by his fellow bishops in the newly-formed church on January 18, 1903. Thus, it became also known as the "Aglipayan Church", after its first supreme bishop. De los Reyes himself would later be formally excommunicated from the Roman Catholic Church in 1903. He assumed the role of the principal theologian, as well as a layperson, of the church. On October 1, 1902, Aglipay headed the signatories, approval, and promulgation of the first and short-lived Constitution of the Iglesia Filipina Independiente. In late 1902, the church opened a seminary which was later renamed Seminario Central de Mabini (predecessor of present-day Aglipay Central Theological Seminary), named after Apolinario Mabini, at Nancamaliran West, Urdaneta, Pangasinan.

Immediately after accepting the post, Aglipay demanded both then Governor-General William Howard Taft and Roman Catholic Church authorities to turn-over the church buildings to him on September 27, 1902, starting with the Manila Cathedral, but got rejected. A five-year campaign resulted in the acquisition of nearly one-half of Roman Catholic Church properties in the country by Aglipay's followers. However, in 1906, the then-conservative Supreme Court of the Philippines ruled that all property that had been occupied by Aglipay's followers had to be returned to the Roman Catholic Church. The Supreme Court of the United States upheld the decision in 1909. The Aglipayan Church was then forced to move to makeshift quarters.

Developing early theology
Aglipay, like José Rizal, later became a Freemason in May 1918. Although not a Mason himself, de los Reyes — who created a distinct doctrine, liturgy, and organization for the Philippine Independent Church — drew some concepts of theology and worship from them, which was then approved formally by Aglipay. De los Reyes was supported by Miguel Morayta, the Grand Master of the Spanish Orient Lodge of Freemasonry in Madrid. The late historian Fr. John N. Schumacher, S.J., contended that Morayta and other non-Filipino Masons and laymen pushed Aglipay and de los Reyes towards schism with the Roman Catholic Church because of their resentment towards the activities of Catholic religious orders in the Philippines, rather than simple admiration and encouragement for Filipino nationalism. Aglipay later named de los Reyes, being a lay person, as Obispo Honorario (Honorary Bishop) of the IFI in 1929.

The Philippine Independent Church continued to follow Roman Catholic forms of worship. The church reformed the Latin Tridentine liturgy and mass in its earliest days were then spoken both in Spanish and the vernacular. Aglipay and de los Reyes had later developed their theology, coming to reject the divinity of Jesus and the concept of the Holy Trinity, officially becoming theologically Unitarian since 1907. Aglipay and de los Reyes' unitarian, rationalist, and progressive theological ideas were even evident in the church's "Catecismo" (1905), "Oficio Divino" (1906), and the novena, "Pagsisiyam sa Birhen sa Balintawak" (1925), as well as its English translation, "Novenary of the Motherland" (1926).

De los Reyes held the position of Honorary Bishop until his death on October 10, 1938. There were claims that he allegedly retracted and returned to the Roman Catholic Church two years before his death. However, his son, Isabelo de los Reyes Jr., who later became supreme bishop, vehemently opposed these said claims. Aglipay, meanwhile, held the position of Supreme Bishop until his death on September 1, 1940.

Ecumenism, factionalism, Aglipayan sects, and schism
From its early years, two principal factions coexisted uneasily within the IFI and had become even more apparent after Isabelo Sr. and Aglipay's death: one Unitarian (led by Aglipay's successor, cleric-turned-politician, and second supreme bishop, Santiago Fonacier, who was faithful to Aglipay and Isabelo Sr.'s theology) and the other Trinitarian (led by Isabelo de los Reyes Jr., who was elected the fourth supreme bishop in 1946).

A schism developed at the tail-end of Fonacier's term, and the Unitarian faction left the church and claimed the right to the name and possession of church properties. Under Isabelo Jr.'s leadership, the church's affiliation with revolutionary movements were severed and abrogated, coupled with his pursuit for ecumenism. On August 4, 1947, a year after the granting of full independence of the Philippines from the United States, the IFI General Assembly, under Isabelo Jr., petitioned the House of Bishops of the Protestant Episcopal Church in the United States of America, one of the churches of the Anglican Communion, to bestow the IFI with apostolic succession. 

On August 5, 1947, the IFI Church officially adopted a new Declaration of Faith and Articles of Religion that were Trinitarian. The House of Bishops of The Episcopal Church in the United States of America then granted the IFI petition during their meeting in November 1947. On April 7, 1948, at the Pro-Cathedral of Saint Luke in Manila, the IFI had its bishops, namely: de los Reyes Jr., Manuel Aguilar, and Gerardo Bayaca (third supreme bishop), reconsecrated and bestowed upon the apostolic succession by The Episcopal Church in the United States of America led by then Missionary Bishop Norman S. Binsted, acting for the Presiding Bishop, and assisted by fellow Episcopal Church bishops Robert F. Wilner and Harry S. Kennedy. Former President Emilio Aguinaldo acted as a sponsor for the three IFI bishops. The Trinitarian IFI then sued the Unitarian faction for sole rights to the name and property of the original IFI.

After prolonged litigation, in 1955, the more dominant Trinitarian faction was finally awarded by the Supreme Court the right to the name and possessions of the original IFI. The IFI then entered into full communion with the Anglican Communion in 1961 through The Episcopal Church in the United States of America. The Episcopal Church assisted in coming up with the IFI liturgical books with a Filipino missal. The missal shows a marked Anglican influence while retaining the form of the Catholic Mass. The church later signed a concordat of full communion with the Church of England in October 1963, the Scottish Episcopal Church in December 1963, and the Old Catholic Union of Utrecht in 1965. Fonacier's group, on the other hand, remained Unitarian, eventually became known as the "Independent Church of Filipino Christians" (ICFC) which would later became a member of the International Association for Religious Freedom (IARF). However, they would soon fragment into other minor groups.

In 1977, the church adopted a new set of Constitution and Canons, as approved by the General Assembly. In 1981, a faction of the church called the "Iglesia Catolica Filipina Independiente" or the "Philippine Independent Catholic Church" (ICFI/PICC), led by Macario V. Ga (fifth supreme bishop) and priest Armando L. de la Cruz, who claimed to have maintained the "original catholic ethos and doctrine of the original nationalist independent church", was formed. Ga was a known staunch supporter of former president and dictator Ferdinand Marcos, which caused tension to a number of bishops and laity who were critical of Marcos and his dictatorship, thus marking the rekindling of the church's revolutionary nationalist roots. The opposing faction rallied the election of Abdias R. de la Cruz, then the Bishop of Aklan and Capiz, as the new supreme bishop in the 1981 General Assembly. Ga then filed a petition at the Securities and Exchange Commission (SEC), in an attempt to nullify the election of de la Cruz. Ga also questioned the authenticity of the approved 1977 Constitution and Canons after a few years from approval. However, even after a motion for reconsideration, both the SEC and the Court of Appeals executed the decision in favor of de la Cruz and the 1977 Constitution and Canons in 1985 and 1987, respectively.

Ga's faction subsequently got their name registered separately in the SEC. The IFI later responded by asking the Court to prevent the faction from using the name "Iglesia Catolica Filipina Independiente", an exact same name in one of the former's SEC-registered recognized alternative names. The SEC reviewed and later revoked the certificate of incorporation of the ICFI and ordered to change its name to avoid confusion with the IFI and all of its dioceses, who had registered the "Iglesia Catolica Filipina Independiente" name first, years before Ga's faction, therefore deemed the rightful owner. The ICFI/PICC appealed and the case reached the Supreme Court. However, because of technicalities, the latter ruled to close and terminate the case. Eventually, in a compromise agreement to further avoid conflict with the IFI, the ICFI/PICC and its chapters/dioceses registered once again in the SEC in a different name in 2014 but only with a slight modification and variation from the previous one, as well as with their Visayas archdiocese correspondingly changing their diocesan name in the SEC to "Eastern Visayas Independent Catholic Church" (EVICC), headed by their metropolitan archbishop Valiant O. Dayagbil. Ultimately, later in 2019, the entire group has since been formally known as the "International Conference of Philippine Independent Catholic Churches of Jesus Christ", which is in concordat with the Anglican Church in North America (ACNA), a non-member province of the Anglican Communion, since 2020. 

From the ICFI/PICC, another breakaway group was established in 1995 under the name "Aglipayan Christian Church Inc.", which is based in Davao City. In the latter half of the 1990s, Ga voluntarily reconciled with the IFI, which led to the signing of a memorandum of agreement. However, Armando de la Cruz, who was already the ICFI/PICC's supreme metropolitan archbishop, was adamant on the reunification. Unlike the IFI wherein the Supreme Bishop is only allowed to have a non-renewable six-year term, Armando de la Cruz of the ICFI/PICC has a lifetime term as supreme metropolitan archbishop.

In 1995, the concordat of full communion between the IFI and the Church of Sweden was signed. On February 17, 1997, the IFI also signed a concordat of full communion with the newly-autonomous Episcopal Church in the Philippines (ECP).

Present day
IFI congregations are also found throughout the Philippine diaspora in North America, Europe, the Middle East, and parts of Asia and the Pacific Islands. The World Council of Churches and the church itself recorded to have a number of roughly 6 million adherents. According to some sources, the church is the second-largest single Christian denomination in the Philippines, after the Roman Catholic Church (some 80.2% of the population), comprising about 6.7% of the total population of the Philippines. By contrast, the 2010 and 2015 Philippine Census recorded only 916,639 and 756,225 members in the country, respectively, or about 1% of the population. Winning large numbers of adherents in its early years because of its nationalist roots, Aglipayan numbers gradually dwindled through the years due to factionalism and doctrinal disagreements.

Unlike the Roman Catholic Church and several other Christian denominations, the church does not discourage its members from joining Freemasonry. Some of the members of the church, like the founders de los Reyes and Aglipay, are political activists, often involved in progressive groups and advocating nationalism, anti-imperialism, democracy, as well as opposing extrajudicial killings. They have often been victims of enforced disappearances and been branded as leftists by the government for being aligned with progressive groups, specifically after Alberto Ramento, the ninth supreme bishop, was killed in 2006 for being an anti-government critic. 

The church then created the "Ramento Project for Rights Defenders", the IFI's human rights advocacy and service arm, in Ramento's honor. The church itself claims to be "not an ally with any particular school of political thought or with any political party, asserting that its members are politically free". Contrary to popular belief, the rule on the separation of church and state does not necessarily mean that the IFI Church is prohibited in human rights advocacies. The church has also managed to build schools from pre-school to college, and cemeteries in some areas of the country managed by its respective dioceses.

Members of the IFI Church refer to themselves collectively as "Aglipayans", "Filipinistas", "Pilipinhons", and "Independientes". They would sometimes brand themselves as the "Native Filipino Catholic Church" to distinguish themselves from adherents of the Roman Catholic Church. The members prefer to refer every August 3 of the year as their "proclamation anniversary" of independence from Rome, rather than founding anniversary, as they claim to continue adhering to catholicity.

Doctrine and practice

Liturgy
The main Sunday liturgy is the Eucharist or the Holy Mass, which is spoken and celebrated in the vernacular. The Eucharistic liturgy of the Iglesia Filipina Independiente resembles that of the Roman Missal, with elements taken from the Anglican Book of Common Prayer, such as the Collect for Purity, the positioning of the Sign of Peace before the Offertory, the Eucharistic Prayers, and the Prayer of Humble Access. Just like the Roman Catholic Church, the IFI church does the sign of the cross in left to right motion. The church, most of the time, uses the Nicene Creed and declares that the Four Marks of the Church ("one, holy, catholic, and apostolic") is present within their church. Orders of service and ceremonies are contained in The Filipino Ritual and The Filipino Missal. Although not officially accepted by the church's biblical canon, the seven deuterocanonical books are regarded by the IFI as "worthy of veneration and source of wisdom". Clergy celebrants are assisted by young male and female altar servers (locally referred as "sacristan"). The church does not have a prescribed dress code for mass attendees. The church follows the IFI Liturgical Ordo Calendar wherein the liturgical seasons, observances, and traditions closely resemble to that of the Roman Catholic Church.

Aglipayans adhere in the Real Presence of Christ in the Eucharist, and communion is distributed under both kinds. However, prior to the church's 1977 Constitution and Canons, they were non-committal in belief regarding transubstantiation. Aglipayans previously maintained that the belief in the real presence does not imply a claim to know how Christ is present in the Eucharistic species. Moreover, belief in the real presence does not imply belief that the consecrated Eucharistic species cease to be bread and wine. Church members were taught that the Eucharistic species, the consecrated bread and the wine, do not necessarily change into the actual body and blood of Jesus Christ but one still receives the body and blood of Christ by faith, asserting instead that Christ is present in the Eucharist in a "heavenly and spiritual manner". Since 1977, the church has embraced the doctrine of transubstantiation and has since believed that the Eucharistic species, although unaltered in outward appearances, are converted into the actual body and blood of Christ at consecration and not just merely symbolically or metaphorically.

Being a nationalist church, Aglipayans employ Filipino national symbols in their liturgical practices, such as the use of national colors and motifs, the singing of the national anthem, and the displaying of the national flag in the sanctuary.

Aglipayans are also adherents to praying the rosary. They also practice house church. They do not usually practice auricular confession since not all priests can administer it, only those who are authorized by their bishops. Aglipayans also repudiate the traditional concept of purgatory. The purgatory, as a physical place, that the IFI believes in, is on Earth. The IFI also has their own process of exorcism, but is not considered a sacrament and has no specific prescribed formula, nor an office of "exorcist". Unlike the Roman Catholic Church, wherein a priest has to undergo specialized training and authority, all ordained IFI priests with "strong spiritual discernment" can perform exorcism, as long as they consulted their respective diocesan bishops, after a careful medical examination to exclude the possibility of mental illness, and should only be done as a last resort. Although not mandatory, the church also highly encourages its members to practice tithing as the minimum standard form of Christian giving.

Apostolic succession
Bishops of the Iglesia Filipina Independiente derive their apostolic succession from The Episcopal Church in the United States of America, which was first bestowed on April 7, 1948. The church rejects the exclusive right to apostolic succession by the Petrine Papacy.

Priesthood
The Iglesia Filipina Independiente maintains the historic threefold ministry of bishops, priests, and deacons. The aforementioned three orders of ministers have distinct vestments from one another. Their vestment varies according to the liturgy being celebrated. Clerical celibacy is optional. It allows its priests to marry, rejecting mandatory clerical celibacy. Priests may also remain unmarried.

The Iglesia Filipina Independiente also allows the ordination of women. In February 1997, Rosalina V. Rabaria of the Diocese of Aklan and Capiz became the first woman to be officially ordained priest in the Iglesia Filipina Independiente. On the other hand, in May 2019, Emelyn Dacuycuy of the Diocese of Batac became the first woman to be ordained bishop in the Iglesia Filipina Independiente, further asserting their belief in women's inclusion and breaking the tradition of patriarchy in the clergy. The church as a whole also refers to itself using female pronouns.

The Iglesia Filipina Independiente has two classification of deacons — the Transitional Deacon (one who is waiting to be ordained for priesthood), and the Permanent (Perpetual) or Vocational Deacon (one who has specialized ministry and not necessarily be ordained to priesthood).

Unlike the Roman Catholic Church and most Anglican churches, the Iglesia Filipina Independiente currently does not have nuns or religious sisters. Some members of the Women of the Philippine Independent Church (WOPIC) wear veils and religious habits, similar to that of the religious sisters, during mass as a "sign of reverence". During Lenten season, a group of WOPIC members called nobisyas (translated to novice in English) render 40-day church services as their pamamanata (act of penance) and wear veil as "an honorable way to imitate Mary, mother of Jesus." The IFI used to have nuns when the Episcopal Sisters of St. Anne in Mindanao and the Episcopal Sisters of Mary the Virgin in Luzon accepted IFI women to their religious congregations for sisterhood training in the 1960s. The IFI sisters later established their own Sisters of the Holy Child Jesus in the 1970s, having their base at the Episcopalian St. Andrew's Theological Seminary, and unlike its priests, the IFI nuns adhere to the vow of chastity. However, due to insufficient institutional patronage, the congregation eventually disbanded, with some of them joining back to the Episcopalian sisters in Luzon.

The Iglesia Filipina Independiente has priests who are military chaplains of the Philippine Army Chaplain Service, and has also launched a ministry for seafarers and their families, the Mission to Seafarers PH. Furthermore, the church has non-ordained lay ministers or lay preachers in every diocese.

A clergy member cannot be in political office or be involved in political election while continuing ministry as ordained. A clergy member upon applying his/her certificate of candidacy is considered resigned. An ordained who had joined an electoral contest, being an official candidate, may be admitted again to the ministry as long as he/she does not concurrently hold a position and after completing a one year refresher course in one of the IFI's seminaries.

Saints
Just like the Roman Catholic Church, IFI members are Marian devotees and devotees of saints. However, several saints canonized by Rome after the 1902 schism are not recognized by the IFI Church and its members. Popes (or Bishops of Rome) universally canonized as saints before the 1902 schism are widely acknowledged by the IFI Church. The IFI Church also celebrates All Saints' Day and All Souls' Day every November 1 and 2, respectively. While veneration of saints is formally practiced, deification of saints on the other hand is condemned by the Church as blasphemy.

In the liturgical calendar of the IFI, the Monday after All Saints' Day is designated as "Commemoration Day for the Martyrs and Confessors of the IFI".

During the early days of the schism particularly in 1903, the church, led by Aglipay together with a number of bishops, canonized José Rizal and the Gomburza priests. However, the church has since revoked their sainthood in the 1950s and already ceased to recognize them as saints up to this day, although they still recognize them as national heroes and early IFI martyrs.

Contraception
Aglipayan bishops joined public demonstrations in support of the Reproductive Health Bill, a legislation advocating for contraception and sex education to reduce the rate of abortion and control rapid population growth that the Roman Catholic Church and several other Christian denominations objected to on moral grounds.

Stance on abortion
Although supportive of the Reproductive Health Bill, the Iglesia Filipina Independiente strongly opposes non-medically necessary induced abortion.

LGBTQ rights

In 2017, the church's position on the LGBTQ+ community changed to an extent wherein the church leadership acknowledged, apologized, and released a statement in which it states, among other things, that the IFI has, for many times, "shown indifference, and have made the LGBTQ+ people feel less human, discriminated against, and stigmatized." The statement – dubbed "Our Common Humanity, Our Shared Dignity" – stresses the church's position that it "must openly embrace God's people of all sexes, sexual orientations, gender identities, and expressions (SSOGIE)." Moreover, although the church is still opposed to the holy matrimony of same-sex couples, the statement stresses that the IFI is "offering their Church as a community where LGBTIQ+ people can freely and responsibly express themselves, pronouncing God's all-inclusive love."

This apology statement's groundwork first came up in 2014, when a gay man articulated during the church plenary his query about the church's plans for sexual minorities. This led to discussions among the newly-elected set of national youth officers, led by an openly gay president and a lesbian executive vice-president, which would later be succeeded by another openly gay president. The church's position on LGBTQ+ persons was approved by the Supreme Council of Bishops and officially adopted by the entire church in February 2017. The church has now fully committed to accepting LGBTQ+ people as part of their congregation, and their ministry. 

On February 24, 2023, the church ordained Wylard "Wowa" Ledama, a transwoman, to the diaconate as the church's first trans clergy. She is assigned at the National Cathedral.

Views on divorce
Church officials expressed openness to the passage of the Divorce Bill in the Philippines. However, they clarified that it should not be misconstrued as a disregard to the "sanctity of marriage", but as a matter of practicality. They further stated that while they believe that couples are duty-bound to keep their marriage vows, divorce may be used as a last resort, when psychological and incompatibility problems make it difficult for both partners to live together.

According to the officials, the IFI's stance on the controversial subject stems from its teachings that emphasize the "people's rights for freedom, dignity, and integrity, which also means encouraging the society to be responsive to the realities of time and to recognize that there have been unions that were wrong". They further clarified that the church will still "guide" couples on not resorting to divorce, if possible.

Response on red-tagging
Several church officials are advocates against the culture of impunity and as a result, a number of advocates have been recipients of accusations by government personnel tagging them as alleged enablers and sympathizers of insurgents and terrorists ("red-tagging"). The church released a statement strongly condemning such allegations. A number of church officials also urged Congress to probe the red-tagging incidents and conduct an impartial investigation.

Organization

The church is autocephalous and is led by the Supreme Bishop, similar to a presiding bishop in other denominations. The 13th and current Supreme Bishop is Rhee Timbang, who was elected on May 9, 2017.

The church has three predominant clergy and laity councils: the Supreme Council of Bishops (SCB), the Council of Priests (COP), and the National Lay Council (NCL).

There are three sectoral organizations of the laity (lay organizations) in the church under the National Lay Council: the Youth of the Iglesia Filipina Independiente (YIFI), the Women of the Philippine Independent Church (WOPIC), and the Laymen of the Iglesia Filipina Independiente (LIFI).

Meanwhile, the priests also have their own sectoral organization: the National Priests Organization (NPO). Other sectoral organizations in the church include, the Clergy Spouses Organization (CSO), and the nonsanctioned Clergy Children Organization (CCO).

The Philippine Independent Church is primarily organized into dioceses. A diocese is composed of parishes and missions. In every diocese, there is a cathedral church that contains the cathedra of a bishop. A parish and mission may have outstations.

Names
Iglesia Filipina Independiente is the official and full legal name of the Philippine Independent Church, while the latter is its English translation as specified in the church's Constitution and Canons. 

Aside from the previously disputed Iglesia Catolica Filipina Independiente, or Philippine Independent Catholic Church in its English translation, other recognized names in which the denomination may alternatively be known are: Iglesia Catolica Apostolica Filipina Independiente or Philippine Independent Catholic Apostolic Church, Iglesia Aglipayana or Aglipayan Church, Iglesia Catolica Aglipayana or Aglipayan Catholic Church, and Iglesia Independiente Aglipayana or Aglipayan Independent Church.

All aforementioned names are duly registered in the Securities and Exchange Commission with SEC Registration No. PW-611, as a religious corporation sole, incorporated in 1904. Iglesia Filipina Independiente, Philippine Independent Church, and Aglipayan Church are much more commonly used.

Notable churches 

The structure of the church buildings, as well as the outstation chapels, of the Philippine Independent Church do not differ significantly from Roman Catholic church buildings in the Philippines.

Cathedral of the Holy Child (National Cathedral) 

Located along Taft Avenue, the Cathedral of the Holy Child in Ermita, Manila, is the National Cathedral of the Iglesia Filipina Independiente and the seat of the supreme bishop. Designed by architect Carlos Arguelles, construction of the church began in 1964 and was inaugurated on May 8, 1969, to commemorate the 109th birth anniversary of its first supreme bishop, Gregorio Aglipay. The church is made largely of bare concrete and wood and has been noted for having a suspended block with sloping trapezoidal walls and textured with horizontal grooves all throughout, suspended with a triangular block.

María Clara Parish Church 

Named after the main heroine in Rizal's Noli Me Tángere, the María Clara Parish Church (formerly the María Clara Christ Church) in Santa Cruz, Manila, was originally built as a wooden structure in 1923 before it was expanded and rebuilt as a concrete structure in the 1950s. When the original national cathedral of the Iglesia Filipina Independiente in Tondo was destroyed during World War II, the María Clara Parish Church became the temporary office of the supreme bishop before relocating in 1969 to the present-day Cathedral of the Holy Child. The original statue of the Virgin of Balintawak is housed in the María Clara Parish Church. While the church building is under the Diocese of Greater Manila Area, the property itself is owned by the de los Reyes family. The current resident bishop of the church is retired bishop Gregorio de los Reyes, son of Isabelo Jr. and grandson of Isabelo Sr.

Seminaries

The Aglipay Central Theological Seminary (ACTS) in Urdaneta City, Pangasinan is the regional seminary of the church serving the North-Central and South-Central Luzon Dioceses. ACTS offers Bachelor of Theology and Divinity programs for members who aspire to enter the ordained ministry. These are four-year study programs with curriculum focusing on biblical, theological, historical, and pastoral studies, with reference to parish management and development, and cultural and social context.

The St. Paul's Theological Seminary (SPTS) in Jordan, Guimaras is the regional seminary of the Church serving the Visayas and Mindanao Dioceses.

The St. Andrew's Theological Seminary (SATS) in Quezon City is run by the Episcopal Church in the Philippines, serving both its church and the Iglesia Filipina Independiente.

The St. John the Divine School of Theology is planned to be established in Mindanao.

Relationship with other Christian denominations

Churches in communion
The church enjoys full communion with the Anglican Communion and The Episcopal Church in the United States since September 22, 1961.

Other churches the IFI is in full communion with include: the Church of England, the Scottish Episcopal Church, the Union of Utrecht, the Episcopal Church in the Philippines, the Church in the Province of the West Indies, the Church of the Province of Central Africa, the Church of the Province of West Africa, the Anglican Church of Kenya, the Anglican Church of Tanzania, the Church of North India, the Church of South India, the Church of Pakistan, the Church of the Province of Myanmar, the Church of Ceylon (extra-provincial), the Nippon Sei Ko Kai, the Church of Ireland, the Lusitanian Catholic Apostolic Evangelical Church (extra-provincial), the Anglican Church of Canada, the Church of Uganda, the Anglican Church of Rwanda, the Anglican Church of Burundi, the Spanish Reformed Episcopal Church (extra-provincial), the Anglican Church of Southern Africa, the Anglican Church in Aotearoa, New Zealand and Polynesia, the Old Catholic Church of Austria, the Old Catholic Church of the Czech Republic, the Old Catholic Church of Germany, the Old Catholic Church of the Netherlands, the Christian Catholic Church of Switzerland, the Polish National Catholic Church of America, the Old Catholic Church of Croatia, the Anglican Episcopal Church of Brazil, and the Church of Sweden.

Relations with the Roman Catholic Church
On August 3, 2021, during the IFI's 119th Proclamation Anniversary and as part of celebrating 500 years of Christianity in the Philippines, Roman Catholic Church leaders from the Catholic Bishops' Conference of the Philippines (CBCP) signed two documents with the IFI "for more ecumenical cooperation amidst diversity." Although the IFI still remains to be independent from the Holy See, in the first joint statement, both IFI and Roman Catholic Church leaders "ask and pray for mutual forgiveness for any injuries inflicted in the past" and "strive for the healing and purification of memories among its members". In addition, the first statement also notes that the IFI, as well, "strives to reach out for healing and reconciliation with other separated Churches founded in the Aglipayan tradition".

The second joint statement, on the other hand, is an expression of mutual recognition by both churches, emphasizing the "mutual recognition of baptisms" between the IFI and the Roman Catholic Church. The Trinitarian baptismal formula of the IFI has already been recognized by the Roman Catholic Church in its list of validly administered baptisms by other Christian churches. For years, IFI officials had been seeking the recognition of their baptismal rites by the Roman Catholic Church in order to ease inter-denominational marriages, notably the blessing of Pope Francis during his state visit to the Philippines in 2015, so that Aglipayans will not be obliged anymore to be baptized as Roman Catholics before they could marry Roman Catholics.

IFI Supreme Bishop Rhee Timbang gave a copy of the IFI's liturgical book and directory to CBCP Secretary General Msgr. Bernardo Pantin during the liturgical launching of the two documents at the IFI National Cathedral.

Further, the IFI accepts baptized individuals from the Roman Catholic Church who wanted to join their church without the requirement of performing another baptism from their end. They are being accepted through the IFI Rite of Reception officiated by the bishop or in his/her absence, by the priest or deacon, after a necessary catechism course to be taken.

Other relations
The IFI is a member of inter-church associations such as the National Council of Churches in the Philippines (NCCP), Christian Conference of Asia (CCA), Council of Churches of East Asia (CCEA), United Society Partners in the Gospel (USPG), and the World Council of Churches (WCC). The church maintains ecumenical ties with other denominations who are also members of the aforementioned organizations.

Notable members

Supreme bishops
 Gregorio Aglipay – first supreme bishop of the church and vicar-general of the Revolutionary Government. The only cleric-delegate present during the creation of the Malolos Constitution. 
 Ephraim Fajutagana – twelfth supreme bishop of the IFI from 2011 to 2017.
 Alberto Ramento – ninth supreme Bishop of the IFI; assassinated in 2006 for being a government critic and an active campaigner against human rights violations in the Philippines.
 Rhee Timbang – thirteenth and current supreme bishop of the IFI since 2017.

Church officials
 Don Isabelo de los Reyes, Sr. – also known as Don Belong; a prominent Filipino politician, writer, and labour activist in the 19th and 20th centuries. He proclaimed the establishment of the IFI. He is often called the "Father of Filipino Socialism" for his writings and activism with labour unions, most notably the Unión Obrera Democrática Filipina. He was also the first to translate the Bible in Ilocano. He was a layperson and the principal theologian of the IFI during its early years. He became an Honorary Bishop in 1929, while his son, Isabelo Jr., would later become supreme bishop in 1946.
 Gardeopatra Quijano – dentist, educator, and feminist writer. National President of the Women of the Philippine Independent Church (WOPIC) (1975–1977). Daughter of IFI Bishop Juan P. Quijano.

Bureaucrats
 Felipe Buencamino, Sr. – lawyer; co-writer of the Malolos Constitution and Secretary of Foreign Relations of the First Philippine Republic. One of the first and pioneering members of the IFI during its inception.
 Alexander Gesmundo – jurist; 27th and incumbent Chief Justice of the Philippines since 2021.
 Cesar Virata – fourth Prime Minister of the Philippines (1981–1986) under the Interim Batasang Pambansa and the Regular Batasang Pambansa. One of the Philippines' business leaders and leading technocrats, he served as Finance Minister from 1970 during the Marcos dictatorship to becoming Prime Minister in 1981. He concurrently was Finance Minister throughout the '80s. He is the grandnephew of the first Philippine President, Emilio Aguinaldo.

Literary artisans
 Hermenegildo Cruz – writer, who later became a member of the Philippine Assembly. A prominent member of Unión Obrera Democrática Filipina and one of the first and pioneering members of the IFI during its inception.
 José Garvida Flores – patriot, prolific Ilokano writer and playwright from Bangui, Ilocos Norte. Composed "Filipinas, Nadayag a Filipinas", which is sung during services of the IFI.
 Rafael Palma – prominent writer, bureaucrat, and lawyer-turned-politician from Manila; fourth President of the University of the Philippines.
 Pascual H. Poblete – writer and linguist, remarkably noted as the first translator of José Rizal's novel Noli Me Tangere into the Tagalog language. A prominent member of Unión Obrera Democrática Filipina and one of the first and pioneering members of the IFI during its inception.
 Lope K. Santos – playwright, writer, poet, politician, and nationalist. Born in Pasig and raised in Pandacan, Manila, he introduced the now-obsolete Abakada Tagalog spelling reform in 1940. Also known by the moniker, the "Father of the Filipino Grammar".
 Vicente Sotto – dramatist, writer, journalist, foremost anti-friar, the fiery Publisher–Editor of "Ang Suga" and "El Pueblo", and the prominent founder of the Filipino Church in Cebu, who later became a politician; grandfather of actor-politician Vicente "Tito" Sotto III and actor-comedian Vic Sotto; great-grandfather of Pasig mayor Vico Sotto.
 Aurelio Tolentino – prominent Pampango writer, dramatist, and one of the early and founding members of the secret society Katipunan. The foremost advocate of the establishment of the Filipino Church in Pampanga.

Military and revolutionary figures
 Edgar Aglipay – retired police officer with the rank of general; Chief of the Philippine National Police from 2004 to 2005 and Chief Deputy Director-General of the National Capital Region Police Office from 1998 to 2000 and 2001 to 2002; descendant of Gregorio Aglipay.
 Baldomero Aguinaldo – a revolutionary general and prominent member of the Katipunan; leader of Katipunan's Magdalo faction; elected President of the Comite de Caballeros (Gentlemen's Committee) of the IFI in Kawit, Cavite; had initially organized a local lay organization within the IFI in Kawit in 1904 which later became the splinter group Iglesia de la Libertad; cousin of Gen. Emilio Aguinaldo and grandfather of Cesar Virata.
 Mariano Álvarez – a revolutionary general and prominent member of the Katipunan from Noveleta, Cavite; leader of Katipunan's Magdiwang faction.
 Pascual Álvarez – a revolutionary general and inaugural Director of the Interior of the Tejeros Revolutionary Government; nephew of Mariano.
 Santiago Álvarez – a revolutionary general and the chief commander of the historic revolutionary forces at Dalahican, Cavite; nicknamed Kidlat ng Apoy ("Lightning of Fire") and the "Hero of the Battle of Dalahican"; son of Mariano.
 Melchora Aquino – a revolutionary who became known as Tandang Sora ("Old Sora") because of her age (84) when the 1896 Philippine Revolution broke out.  She gained the titles "Grand Woman of the Revolution" and "Mother of Balintawak" for her contributions to the independence movement. She was among the Church's most prominent and devoted followers in Caloocan.
 Ladislao Diwa – one of the co-founders and high-ranking officials of the Katipunan from Cavite City; later became part of the revolutionary army when he joined the revolutionary troops in Cavite during the Philippine Revolution.
 Leandro Fullon – a revolutionary general who fought during both the Philippine Revolution and the Philippine–American War. Appointed as commanding general of all Filipino forces in the Visayas and became the liberator of Antique province. Later established and became the first Filipino governor of the Revolutionary Provincial Government of Antique.
 Mariano Noriel – a revolutionary general who fought during both the Philippine Revolution and the Philippine–American War. He led Filipino advance troops before the American army landed in Intramuros in 1898. He was the first president of the laymen organization of the IFI in Bacoor, Cavite.

Physicians
Dominador Gómez – patriot and medical doctor, who later became a writer and a member of the Philippine Assembly. A prominent member of Unión Obrera Democrática Filipina and one of the first and pioneering members of the IFI during its inception.

Politicians
 Crispin Beltran – legislator and labour leader, also known as the "Grand Old Man of Philippine Labour". A member of the 13th Congress of the Philippines as party-list representative and former chair of Kilusang Mayo Uno (KMU), he was a major figure in contemporary Filipino history.
 Nicolas Buendia – assemblyman of Bulacan's first district from 1935 to 1941, 8th Governor of Bulacan, and senator from 1941 to 1946. One of the first and pioneering members of the IFI during its inception.
 Rhodora Cadiao – incumbent provincial Governor of Antique (since 2015).
 Bayani Fernando – former representative, former mayor of Marikina, and former chairman of the Metropolitan Manila Development Authority.
 Mariano Marcos – lawyer, Japanese collaborator, and politician from Ilocos Norte. A Congressman from 1925 to 1931. He is best known for being the father of former president and dictator Ferdinand Marcos.
 Salvacion Z. Perez – former Governor of Antique from 2001 to 2010; daughter of former Associate Justice Calixto Zaldivar.
 Gedeon G. Quijano – former Governor of Misamis Occidental and physician. The longest-serving governor in the history of the province. Son of IFI Bishop Juan P. Quijano.
 Calixto Zaldivar – former representative of the Lone District of Antique (1934–1935), former provincial Governor of Antique (1951–1955), and former Associate Justice of the Supreme Court (1964–1974). Also a former president of the National Lay Organization of the IFI.

Former members

Presidents
 Emilio Aguinaldo – first President of the Philippines. With his influence, together with other Caviteño revolutionary generals and officers, the IFI gained a stronghold in Cavite. His cousin, Baldomero, was the president of Comité de Caballeros (Gentlemen's Committee) of the IFI in Kawit; while his youngest sister Felicidad, his wife Hilaria del Rosario, and his mother Trinidad Famy were officers of the Comisión de Damas (Women's Commission) of the church. Subsequently reverted to Roman Catholicism in later life.
 Ferdinand Marcos – former president and dictator of the Philippines (1965–1986); son of Mariano. Raised Aglipayan, but subsequently converted to Roman Catholicism to marry Imelda Romualdez of Leyte.

Entertainment personalities
 Marian Rivera – television and film actress, model. Baptized in a Catholic denomination in Spain, which is not validly recognized by the Roman Catholic Church, and became an adherent to the Iglesia Filipina Independiente and practitioner of the Aglipayan faith after moving to the Philippines; re-baptized in the Roman Catholic Church to marry fellow actor Dingdong Dantes in 2014, seven years before the mutual recognition of baptisms between the IFI and the Roman Catholic Church.

Lawyers
Ferdinand Topacio – renowned lawyer known for his controversial high-profile cases involving clients who are high-ranking government officials and celebrities. Born and raised Aglipayan, but subsequently converted to Iglesia ni Cristo in middle age.

Other politicians
 Juan Ponce Enrile – politician, bureaucrat, and lawyer, known for being a multi-termed senator; assemblyman of Cagayan from 1984 to 1986; assemblyman of Region II from 1978 to 1984; member of the Philippine House of Representatives from Cagayan's 1st district (1992–1995); 37th Secretary of Justice; 15th Minister of Defense; 21st President of the Senate of the Philippines; and incumbent Chief Presidential Legal Counsel since 2022. Baptized and raised Aglipayan, but converted to Roman Catholicism at age 20.

See also

 Christianity in the Philippines
 Protestantism in the Philippines

Notes

References

External links 

 Official website

Philippine Independent Church
Independent Catholic denominations
1902 establishments in the Philippines
Christianity in the Philippines
Christian denominations in Asia
Christian denominations in the Philippines
Christian denominations founded in the Philippines
Christian organizations established in 1902
Christian denominations established in the 20th century
Members of the World Council of Churches
Trinitarianism
Anglo-Catholicism
Religious nationalism
Schisms from the Catholic Church
Philippine Revolution